Saadia may refer to::

People with the given name
Saadia (given name)
Saadia Gaon, rabbi, Jewish philosopher, and exegete of the Geonic period
Saadia Ibn Danan (died 1493), rabbi, poet, and Dayan in Grenada

People with the surname
Dany Saadia (born 1969), Mexican entrepreneur, screenwriter, and filmmaker
Nouara Saadia (born 1950), Algerian politician

Others
Saadia (film), a 1953 adventure film

See also
Saadiyat Island, a natural island and a tourism-cultural project for nature and Emirati heritage and culture that is located in Abu Dhabi, United Arab Emirates